Curtis Kitchen (born January 30, 1964) is an American former professional basketball player. He was a 6'9" (2.05 m) 235 lb (107 kg) power forward. Born in Cape Coral, Florida, he played collegiately at the University of South Florida for four seasons (1982–1986).

Kitchen was selected with the 6th pick of the sixth round (122nd pick overall) in the 1986 NBA Draft by the Seattle SuperSonics. He played for the Sonics for altogether 14 games in 1986-87 (6 games in the regular season and 8 games in playoffs), averaging 1.5 points and 1.5 rebounds per contest in the regular season.

Kitchen also played in the Continental Basketball Association (CBA) for three seasons. He played the majority of the 1986–87 season for the Albany Patroons before being signed by the Sonics, then played the 1994–95 and 1995–96 seasons with the Yakima Sun Kings. In 134 CBA games, Kitchen averaged 5.5 points and 7.7 rebounds per game.

References

External links
French League profile

1964 births
Living people
Albany Patroons players
American expatriate basketball people in France
American men's basketball players
Basketball players from Florida
Cholet Basket players
FC Mulhouse Basket players
People from Cape Coral, Florida
Power forwards (basketball)
Seattle SuperSonics draft picks
Seattle SuperSonics players
South Florida Bulls men's basketball players
Universiade medalists in basketball
Universiade silver medalists for the United States
Yakima Sun Kings players
Medalists at the 1985 Summer Universiade